Rhodoprasina corolla is a species of moth of the  family Sphingidae. It is known from Thailand.

References

Rhodoprasina
Moths described in 1990